In Turkey, the General Directorate of Prisons and Detention Houses (often abbreviated as CTE) is an institution affiliated with the Ministry of Justice and responsible for controlling prisons. The institution was established in 1923 and is responsible for managing, supervising and monitoring detention centers, as well as doing maintenance and addressing the needs of convicts and detainees. Its headquarters is located in Altındağ, Ankara.

Affiliated units

Central agency 
 Security and Execution Department
 Support Services Department
 Personnel Training Department
 Health and Press Public Relations Department
 Foreign Relations Department
 Training and Improvement Department
 Probation Department
 Personnel Department
 Board of Controllers Department

Provincial organizations 
 Criminal and detention centers

References

External links 
 

Organizations established in 1923
Prisons in Turkey
Law enforcement in Turkey